The House of Romanov was the second and last imperial dynasty to rule over Russia, reigning from 1613 until 1917.

Romanov may also refer to:
 Romanov sheep
 Romanov (vodka)

People with the surname
 Alexander Romanov (fighter), Moldovan mixed martial artist 
 Alexander Romanov (ice hockey, born 2000), Russian hockey player
 Andrew Romanoff (b. 1966), American politician
 Eva Romanová (born 1946), Czech figure skater
 Grigory Romanov (1923–2008), Soviet statesman and Hero of Socialist Labor
 Giana Romanova (born 1955), Soviet middle distance runner
 Ivan Romanov (1607?–1640), Tsar's cousin
 Ivan Romanov (Catholic bishop) (1878–1953), Bulgarian Roman Catholic prelate
 Maxim Romanov, Russian rugby league player
 Mikhail Timofeyevich Romanov (1891–1941), Soviet army officer
 Olga Romanova (athlete) (born 1980), Russian long-distance runner
 Panteleimon Romanov (1884–1938), Russian/Soviet writer
 Pyotr Romanov, (1682-1725)  Emperor of Russian Empire
 Roman Romanov (Lithuanian businessman) (born 1976)
 Roman Romanov (Ukrainian businessman) (born 1972)
 Roman Romanov (footballer, born 1981), Russian football player
 Roy Romanow (born 1939), Canadian politician
 Sergey Anatolyevich Romanov
 Stephanie Romanov (born 1969) Russian-American model and actress
 Vladimir Romanov, Russian-Lithuanian businessman
 Vladislav Romanov, Bulgarian football player
 Yelena Romanova, Russian middle distance runner

Fictional 
 Natalia Romanov, from the Grey Griffins novel series
 Nene Romanova , from Bubblegum Crisis
 Tatiana Romanova, a James Bond girl
 Alexander Romanov (Command & Conquer), the Soviet Premier in Red Alert 2
 Black Widow (Natasha Romanova), a spy in Marvel Comics
 Helena Cassadine, a character from General Hospital; her maiden name is Romanov

See also 
 Alexandra Romanova (disambiguation)
 Irina Romanova (disambiguation)
 Konstantin Romanov (disambiguation)
 Maria Romanova (disambiguation)
 Michael Romanov (disambiguation)
 Nicholas Romanov (disambiguation)
 Romanovo, a list of places

Russian-language surnames
Bulgarian-language surnames